The 2014 St. George Illawarra Dragons season is the 16th in the joint venture club's history. Coached by Steve Price until his mid-season replacement by Paul McGregor, and captained by Ben Creagh, they're competing in the NRL's 2014 Telstra Premiership season. The Dragons had a strong start to the premiership's regular season, being the last team to remain undefeated. Part-way through the season Benji Marshall, after his brief stint in New Zealand rugby union, returned to the NRL with the Dragons, partnering Gareth Widdop in the halves.

Transfers
New Signings
 Mike Cooper from Warrington Wolves
 Dylan Farrell from South Sydney Rabbitohs
 Gareth Widdop from Melbourne Storm
 Joel Thompson from Canberra Raiders
 Sam Williams from Canberra Raiders
 Matt Groat from Wests Tigers
 Josh Ailaomai from Sydney Roosters
 Peter Mata'utia from Newcastle Knights

Transfers / Leaving
 Jamie Soward to Penrith Panthers
 Matt Cooper Retired
 Nathan Fien Retired
 Michael Weyman to Hull Kingston Rovers
 Matt Prior to Parramatta Eels
 Bronx Goodwin Released
 Chase Stanley to Canterbury-Bankstown Bulldogs
 Cameron King to North Queensland Cowboys
 Daniel Vidot to Brisbane Broncos
 Kane Brennan to Canterbury-Bankstown Bulldogs
 Jackson Hastings to Sydney Roosters

Re-signed
 Leeson Ah Mau til 2015
 Ben Creagh til 2016
 Josh Dugan til 2017
 Craig Garvey til 2015
 Wil Matthews til 2014
 Adam Quinlan til 2015
 Mitch Rein til 2016

References

St. George Illawarra Dragons seasons
St. George Illawarra Dragons season